The 2015–16 Troy Trojans men's basketball team represented Troy University during the 2015–16 NCAA Division I men's basketball season. The Trojans, led by third year head coach Phil Cunningham, played their home games at Trojan Arena and were members of the Sun Belt Conference. They finished the season 9–22, 4–16 in Sun Belt play to finish in last place. They failed to qualify for the Sun Belt tournament.

Roster

Schedule

|-
!colspan=9 style="background:#960018; color:white;"|  Exhibition

|-
!colspan=9 style="background:#960018; color:white;"| Regular season

References

Troy Trojans men's basketball seasons
Troy
2015 in sports in Alabama
2016 in sports in Alabama